Proline-rich protein 23C  is a protein that in humans is encoded by the proline-rich 23C (PRR23C) gene.

Gene

PRR23C Homo sapiens is located on the long arm of chromosome 3, (3q23) on the antisense strand.   When pertaining to the mRNA of PRR23C Homo sapiens, it is 2,791 bp in length. PRR23C Homo sapiens has one exon covering the entire length of mRNA (1-2,791 bp).
PRR23C Homo sapiens has a clone name of FLJ46210.

Expression

PRR23C Homo sapiens is expressed in the testis. Ottolini et al. (2014) discussed the PRR23 family to which they revealed that through RNA sequencing data, that PRR23A, PRR23B and PRR23C are testis-specific genes. Ottolini et al. (2014) believes that this family may be a crucial part for the male reproductive system given their RNA-seq data findings.

Protein
Proline-rich protein 23C Homo sapiens is 262 amino acids long with a calculated molecular weight of 27,674 Da. Proline-rich protein 23C Homo sapiens has a domain of unknown function (DUF2476) that spans the majority of the protein (1-259 aa) which is a conserved domain. DUF2476 belongs to pfam10630 which is a part of superfamily c|11241. DUF2476 is a family of proteins that are rich in proline residues and have unknown function. Proline-rich protein 23C is the preferred name but other aliases include proline-rich protein 23A.

Protein composition

Proline is predicted to be the most abundant amino acid in proline-rich protein 23C Homo sapiens. In comparison to the prevalence of amino acids in other human proteins, it is predicted that proline-rich protein 23C Homo sapiens has a higher abundance of proline along with very low abundances of asparagine, threonine, and lysine. Orthologs for this protein are predicted to also have a high abundance of proline.

Isoelectric point

The basal isoelectric point for PRR23C Homo sapiens was 4.48 (pH) according to phoshosite.org.

Sub-cellular localization

Proline-rich protein 23C is predicted to localize to the nucleus for the human protein and its orthologs. There are predicted nuclear localization signals seen in both the human proline-rich protein 23C and its orthologs.

Homology

Orthologs

PRR23C Homo sapiens is strictly conserved in mammals.
The table below lists mammalian orthologs for PRR23C Homo sapiens .

Paralogs

There were two paralogs found for PRR23C Homo sapiens: PRR23B and PRR23A. Both have similar sequence identities with PRR23B having 86% identity and PRR23A having 85% identity.

References

Human proteins